General Motors introduced the front-wheel drive GM4200 platform in 1982 with the introductions of two subcompacts, the Opel Corsa A and the Vauxhall Nova. It was originally known as the S-car. The platform was also used by Holden, Chevrolet's Latin American branch, and Buick of China. The platform was still in use until 2021 by Chevrolet's Latin American branch for their entry-level models. This platform became very popular in Mexico in 1994, when the model renamed Chevy Swing (4 door) and Chevy Joy (2 door) was imported from Spain. In 1996, the models were built in Mexico and several variants were offered: a 4-door sedan (called Monza), a 2- and a 4-door hatchback, a pickup truck, and a station wagon (imported from Chile). The popular Chevy went on with cosmetic changes (the C2, introduced in 2004), that included changes to the front end and dashboard, and another redesign in 2009. It was retired after the 2011 model year.

Models
 2010–2021 Chevrolet Montana (Mercosul)
 2009–2016 Chevrolet Agile (Mercosul)
 2006–2012 Chevrolet Prisma
 2002–2016 Chevrolet Classic
 2000–2015 Chevrolet Celta
 1993–2001 Chevrolet Corsa
 1994–2012 Chevrolet Chevy (Mexico Only)
 2001–2010 Buick Sail (Later Chevrolet Sail)
 1993–2000 Holden Barina
 1983–1992 Opel Corsa A
 1993–2000 Opel Corsa B
 1994–2000 Opel Tigra A
 1993–2000 Opel Vita
 1993–2000 Vauxhall Corsa
 1983–1992 Vauxhall Nova

References

GM4200